A Million Billion is an indie/electronica solo-project-turned-band from Brooklyn, New York. It was led by Ryan Ross Smith, a previous member of Stars Like Fleas and The Silent League.

Ryan Smith began to realise his own solo material in 2005 under the A Million Billion name, with the Today We Love You album and Filthy Schoolgirls EP. February 2006 saw the addition of Michael Fadem, Jon Natchez, Kevin Thaxton and Gene Park to the line-up, and a UK debut with the "Volcano Season" single on EXERCISE1 Records.

Discography

Singles and EPs
 Filthy Schoolgirls - June 15, 2005, EP
 "Volcano Season" - February 27, 2006, limited-edition single on EXERCISE1 Records

Albums
 Today We Love You - August 30, 2005, Album on Filthy Schoolgirls

External links 
Official website
XFM review / tracklisting of Volcano Season single

Electronic music groups from New York (state)
Musical groups from Brooklyn